The Valea Boiului is a small left tributary of the river Crișul Repede in Romania. It discharges into the Crișul Repede in Lorău.

References

Rivers of Romania
Rivers of Bihor County